The demographics of Ethiopia encompass the demographic features of inhabitants in Ethiopia, including ethnicity, languages, population density, education level, health, economic status, religious affiliations and other aspects of the population.

Ethnic groups
 

The country's population is highly diverse, comprising over 90 different ethnic groups. Most people in Ethiopia speak Afroasiatic languages, mainly of the Semitic or Cushitic branches. Among these are the Oromo, Amhara, Somali and Tigrayans, who together constitute around three-quarters of the population.

Nilo-Saharan-speaking Nilotic ethnic minorities also inhabit the southern regions of the country, particularly in areas bordering South Sudan. Among these are the Mursi and Anuak.

Languages

Ethiopia, like most countries in Africa, is a multi-ethnic state. Although the original physical differences between the major ethnic groups have been blurred by centuries, if not millennia, of intermarriage, there remain many who are distinct and unique.

Ethnic differences may also be observed from the great variety of languages spoken in the country, of which there are eighty-three, with 200 dialects. These can be broken into four main groups: Semitic, Cushitic, Omotic, and Nilo-Saharan.

The Semitic languages of Ethiopia are related to both Hebrew and Arabic. The Ethiopian languages of this family are derived from Ethio-Semitic the ancestor of Ge'ez, the language of the ancient Axumite kingdom, which was also the language of the country's literature prior to the mid-nineteenth century, as well as parts of most present-day church services.

Ethiopia's Semitic languages are today spoken mainly in the north and centre of the country. The most important of them in the north is Tigrinya, which is used throughout Tigray.

The principal Semitic language of the north-west and centre of the country is Amharic, which is the language of the Amhara Region. Moreover, Amharic is also one of the official working languages of Ethiopia. Moreover, Amharic is also the language of much modern Ethiopian literature.

Two other Semitic languages are spoken to the south and east of Addis Ababa: the Gurage languages, a cluster of languages used by the Gurage in an area to the south of the capital, and Adare, a tongue spoken only within the old walled city of Harar and used by the Adare people, also known as Harrari.

The Cushitic languages, which are less closely related than the Semitic, are found mainly in the south of the country. The most important tongue in this group is Oromo. It is used in a wide stretch of the country, including Oromia, Dire Dawa, Harari Region, Oromia Zone and Addis Ababa and the surrounding Special Zone.

Oromo serves as one of the official working languages of Ethiopia and is also the working language of several of the states within the Ethiopian federal system including Oromia, Harar and Dire Dawa regional states and of the Oromia Zone in the Amhara Region.

Other Cushitic languages in the area comprise Somali, which is spoken by the Somali in the Somali Region to the east, as well as in the neighboring Somali Republic and parts of Djibouti, and the Sidamo language, used in the Sidama Region. Cushitic languages, however, are also used in the north of the country, namely Afar, spoken in the Afar Region and the northern half of the Djibouti Republic; Saho, in parts of Tigray; and Agaw, a group of languages in various pockets in western and northern Ethiopia.

The Omotic group of languages, which comprise considerably fewer speakers than either the Semitic or the Cushitic languages, are spoken in the south-west of the country. They have been given that name because they are spoken in the general area of the Omo River.

The Nilo-Saharan languages are spoken in a wide arc of the country towards the Sudan and South-Sudan frontier. They include, from north to south, Gumuz and Berta in the Benishangul-Gumuz Region, and Anuak in Gambela Region.

Modern contraception utilization
Only 28.1% within the ages of 15–49 years used modern contraceptives, according to the data from 2019 Ethiopian Mini Demographic and Health Survey.

Religion

Various religions are adhered to in Ethiopia. Most Christians live in the highlands, whereas Muslims mainly inhabit the lowlands. Adherents of traditional faiths are primarily concentrated in the southern regions.

According to the Ethiopian Central Statistical Agency (2007 census), the national religious composition is Ethiopian Orthodox 43.5%, Protestantism 18.6%, Roman Catholicism 0.7%, Islam 33.9%, traditional 2.6%, and others 0.6%.

Population

Source: Central Statistical Agency (CSA)

UN estimates

The proportion of children below the age of 15 in 2010 was 41.5%, 55.8% was between 15 and 65 years of age, while 3.3% was 65 years or older. The average age was 25.1.

Population Estimates by Sex and Age Group (01.VII.2020):

UN projections
Below are the UN's medium variant projections:

Vital statistics
Registration of vital events in Ethiopia is incomplete. The Population Department of the United Nations prepared the following estimates:

CBR = crude birth rate (per 1,000); CDR = crude death rate (per 1,000); NC = natural change (per 1,000); IMR = infant mortality rate per 1,000 births; TFR = total fertility rate (number of children per woman); IMR = infant mortality rate per 1,000 births

Source: UN World Population Prospects

Total fertility rate in Ethiopia (census 2007)

As per 2007 Population and Housing Census of Ethiopia

Fertility and Births (Demographic and Health Surveys)
Total Fertility Rate (TFR) (Wanted Fertility Rate) and Crude Birth Rate (CBR):

Fertility data as of 2011 (DHS Program):

Other demographic statistics
Demographic statistics according to the World Population Review in 2019.

One birth every 9 seconds	
One death every 43 seconds	
One net migrant every 144 minutes	
Net gain of one person every 11 seconds

The following demographic statistics are from the CIA World Factbook.

Population
113,656,596 (2022 est.)
 (estimate for )

Religions
Ethiopian Orthodox 43.8%, Muslim 31.3%, Protestant 22.8%, Catholic 0.7%, traditional 0.6%, other 0.8% (2016 est.)

Age structure

0–14 years: 39.81% (male 21,657,152/female 21,381,628)
15–24 years: 19.47% (male 10,506,144/female 10,542,128)
25–54 years: 32.92% (male 17,720,540/female 17,867,298)
55–64 years: 4.42% (male 2,350,606/female 2,433,319)
65 years and over: 3.38% (male 1,676,478/female 1,977,857) (2020 est.)

0–14 years: 43.21% (male 23,494,593 /female 23,336,508)
15–24 years: 20.18% (male 10,857,968 /female 11,011,100)
25–54 years: 29.73% (male 15,978,384 /female 16,247,086)
55–64 years: 3.92% (male 2,059,129 /female 2,185,814)
65 years and over: 2.97% (male 1,445,547 /female 1,770,262) (2018 est.)

0–14 years: 43.94% (male 21,900,571/female 21,809,643)
15–24 years: 19.98% (male 9,865,976/female 10,009,596)
25–54 years: 29.31% (male 14,487,280/female 14,667,179)
55–64 years: 3.88% (male 1,882,315/female 1,981,762)
65 years and over: 2.88% (male 1,289,336/female 1,572,161) (2015 est.)

Population growth rate
2.46% (2022 est.) Country comparison to the world: 25th
2.83% (2018 est.) Country comparison to the world: 11th
2.89% (2015 est.)

Birth rate
30.49 births/1,000 population (2022 est.) Country comparison to the world: 29th
36 births/1,000 population (2018 est.) Country comparison to the world: 17th
37.27 births/1,000 population (2015 est.)

Death rate
5.7 deaths/1,000 population (2022 est.) Country comparison to the world: 173rd
7.5 deaths/1,000 population (2018 est.) Country comparison to the world: 110th
8.19 deaths/1,000 population (2015 est.)

Total fertility rate
3.99 children born/woman (2022 est.) Country comparison to the world: 28th
4.91 children born/woman (2018 est.) Country comparison to the world: 15th
5.15 children born/woman (2015 est.)

Median age
total: 19.8 years. Country comparison to the world: 197th
male: 19.6 years
female: 20.1 years (2020 est.)

total: 18 years. Country comparison to the world: 213rd
male: 17.8 years 
female: 18.2 years (2018 est.)

total: 17.7 years
male: 17.5 years
female: 17.8 years (2015 est.)

Net migration rate
-0.19 migrant(s)/1,000 population (2022 est.) Country comparison to the world: 110th
-0.2 migrant(s)/1,000 population (2017 est.) Country comparison to the world: 107th

Mother's mean age at first birth
19.3 years (2019 est.)
note: median age at first birth among women 20–49

20 years (2016 est.)
note: median age at first birth among women 25–29

Contraceptive prevalence rate
37% (2019)
36.5% (2017)

Urbanization
urban population: 22.7% of total population (2022)
rate of urbanization: 4.4% annual rate of change (2020–25 est.)

urban population: 20.8% of total population (2018)
rate of urbanization: 4.63% annual rate of change (2015–20 est.)

urban population: 19.5% of total population (2015)
rate of urbanization: 4.89% annual rate of change (2010–15 est.)

Dependency ratios
total dependency ratio: 82.1 (2015 est.)
youth dependency ratio: 75.8 (2015 est.)
elderly dependency ratio: 6.3 (2015 est.)
potential support ratio: 15.8 (2015 est.)

Sex ratio
at birth: 1.03 male(s)/female
0-14 years: 1 male(s)/female
15-24 years: 0.99 male(s)/female
25-54 years: 0.99 male(s)/female
55-64 years: 0.95 male(s)/female
65 years and over: 0.82 male(s)/female
total population: 0.99 male(s)/female (2015 est.)

Life expectancy at birth

total population: 68.25 years. Country comparison to the world: 183rd
male: 66.12 years
female: 70.44 years (2022 est.)

total population: 63 years 
male: 60.5 years 
female: 65.5 years (2018 est.)

total population: 61.48 years
male: 59.11 years
female: 63.93 years (2015 est.)

HIV/AIDS
adult prevalence rate: 1.15%
people living with HIV/AIDS: 730,300
deaths: 23,400 (2014 est.)

Literacy
definition: age 15 and over can read and write

total population: 51.8%
male: 57.2%
female: 44.4% (2017)

total population: 49.1%
male: 57.2%
female: 41.1% (2015 est.)

School life expectancy (primary to tertiary education)
total: 8 years (2012)
male: 9 years (2012)
female: 8 years (2012)

Major infectious diseases
degree of risk: very high (2020)
food or waterborne diseases: bacterial and protozoal diarrhea, hepatitis A, and typhoid fever
vectorborne diseases: malaria and dengue fever
water contact diseases: schistosomiasis
animal contact diseases: rabies
respiratory diseases: meningococcal meningitis

note: on 21 March 2022, the US Centers for Disease Control and Prevention (CDC) issued a Travel Alert for polio in Africa; Ethiopia is currently considered a high risk to travelers for circulating vaccine-derived polioviruses (cVDPV); vaccine-derived poliovirus (VDPV) is a strain of the weakened poliovirus that was initially included in oral polio vaccine (OPV) and that has changed over time and behaves more like the wild or naturally occurring virus; this means it can be spread more easily to people who are unvaccinated against polio and who come in contact with the stool or respiratory secretions, such as from a sneeze, of an “infected” person who received oral polio vaccine; the CDC recommends that before any international travel, anyone unvaccinated, incompletely vaccinated, or with an unknown polio vaccination status should complete the routine polio vaccine series; before travel to any high-risk destination, CDC recommends that adults who previously completed the full, routine polio vaccine series receive a single, lifetime booster dose of polio vaccine

Unemployment, youth ages 15–24
total: 10%(2021 est.) Country comparison to the world: 88th 
male: 8 % (2021 est.)
female:3 % (2021 est.)

See also

Habesha peoples

References

Attribution